"Mi Santa" ("My Saint") is a bachata song by American singer Romeo Santos from his debut studio album Fórmula, Vol. 1 (2011). Produced by Santos, the track was released as the album's third single in Latin America and the United States. It features Spanish guitarist Tomatito. The track was nominated for Collaboration and Tropical Song of the Year at the Premio Lo Nuestro 2013.

Background

Romeo Santos was the lead member of Aventura, an urban and bachata infused band, which sold 1.7 million albums in the United States and had the best-selling Latin album of 2009 The Last. After the band's temporary separation, Santos was announced as the star of an upcoming comedy series to be premiered on ABC. The series will deal with the struggle of a Dominican American fighting his beliefs to success in the United States and will be Santos' debut acting job. Following the announcement, Santos signed a record deal with Sony Music Entertainment and recorded his debut studio album, Formula, Vol. 1, which includes most of the tracks in bachata rhythm and bilingual songs such as the lead single "You" and "Promise", featuring Usher.

Charts and certifications

Weekly charts

Year-end charts

Certifications

See also
 List of number-one Billboard Hot Tropical Songs of 2012
 List of number-one Billboard Top Latin Songs of 2012

References

2011 songs
2012 singles
Romeo Santos songs
Songs written by Romeo Santos
Sony Music Latin singles